Amar Shaheed Nathu Dhobi also known as
Nathu Dhobi was a first freedom fighter to lead the Jallianwala Bagh struggle in the state of Amritsar,Punjab in 1919.

References 

History of Punjab, India
Mass murder in 1919
Indian independence movement
April 1919 events